Horus, also known as Hor in Ancient Egyptian, is one of the most significant ancient Egyptian deities who served many functions, most notably as god of kingship and the sky. He was worshipped from at least the late prehistoric Egypt until the Ptolemaic Kingdom and Roman Egypt. Different forms of Horus are recorded in history, and these are treated as distinct gods by Egyptologists. These various forms may be different manifestations of the same multi-layered deity in which certain attributes or syncretic relationships are emphasized, not necessarily in opposition but complementary to one another, consistent with how the Ancient Egyptians viewed the multiple facets of reality. He was most often depicted as a falcon, most likely a lanner falcon or peregrine falcon, or as a man with a falcon head.

The earliest recorded form of Horus is the tutelary deity of Nekhen in Upper Egypt, who is the first known national god, specifically related to the ruling pharaoh who in time came to be regarded as a manifestation of Horus in life and Osiris in death. The most commonly encountered family relationship describes Horus as the son of Isis and Osiris, and he plays a key role in the Osiris myth as Osiris's heir and the rival to Set, the murderer and brother of Osiris. In another tradition, Hathor is regarded as his mother and sometimes as his wife.

Claudius Aelianus wrote that Egyptians called the god Apollo "Horus" in their own language. However, Plutarch, elaborating further on the same tradition reported by the Greeks; specified that the one "Horus" whom the Egyptians equated with the Greek Apollo was in fact "Horus the Elder", who is distinct from Horus the son of Osiris and Isis (that would make him "the Younger").

Etymology
Additional meanings are thought to have been "the distant one" or "one who is above, over". It also survives in Late Egyptian and Coptic theophoric name forms such as Siese
"son of Isis" and Harsiese "Horus, Son of Isis".

Horus and the pharaoh 

The Pyramid Texts (c. 2400–2300 BCE) describe the nature of the pharaoh in different characters as both Horus and Osiris. The pharaoh as Horus in life became the pharaoh as Osiris in death, where he was united with the other gods. New incarnations of Horus succeeded the deceased pharaoh on earth in the form of new pharaohs.The lineage of Horus, the eventual product of unions between the children of Atum, may have been a means to explain and justify pharaonic power. The gods produced by Atum were all representative of cosmic and terrestrial forces in Egyptian life. By identifying Horus as the offspring of these forces, then identifying him with Atum himself, and finally identifying the Pharaoh with Horus, the Pharaoh theologically had dominion over all the world.

Origin mythology 
In one tale, Horus is born to the goddess Isis after she retrieved all the dismembered body parts of her murdered husband Osiris, except his penis, which was thrown into the Nile and eaten by a catfish, or sometimes depicted as instead by a crab, and according to Plutarch's account used her magic powers to resurrect Osiris and fashion a phallus to conceive her son (older Egyptian accounts have the penis of Osiris surviving).

After becoming pregnant with Horus, Isis fled to the Nile Delta marshlands to hide from her brother Set, who jealously killed Osiris and who she knew would want to kill their son. There Isis bore a divine son, Horus. As birth, death and rebirth are recurrent themes in Egyptian lore and cosmology, it is not particularly strange that Horus also is the brother of Osiris and Isis, by Nut and Geb, together with Nephthys and Set. This elder Horus is called Hrw-wr - Hourou'Ur - as opposed to Hrw-P-Khrd - the younger Horus, at some point adopted by the Greeks as Harpocrates.

Genealogy

Mythological roles

Sky god 

Since Horus was said to be the sky, he was considered to also contain the Sun and Moon. Egyptians believed that the Sun was his right eye and the Moon his left and that they traversed the sky when he, a falcon, flew across it. Later, the reason that the Moon was not as bright as the sun was explained by a tale, known as The Contendings of Horus and Seth. In this tale, it was said that Set, the patron of Upper Egypt, and Horus, the patron of Lower Egypt, had battled for Egypt brutally, with neither side victorious, until eventually, the gods sided with Horus.

As Horus was the ultimate victor he became known as ḥr.w or "Horus the Great", but more usually translated as "Horus the Elder". In the struggle, Set had lost a testicle, and Horus' eye was gouged out.

Horus was occasionally shown in art as a naked boy with a finger in his mouth sitting on a lotus with his mother. In the form of a youth, Horus was referred to as nfr ḥr.w "Good Horus", transliterated Neferhor, Nephoros or Nopheros (reconstructed as ).

The Eye of Horus is an ancient Egyptian symbol of protection and royal power from deities, in this case from Horus or Ra. The symbol is seen on images of Horus' mother, Isis, and on other deities associated with her. In the Egyptian language, the word for this symbol was "wedjat" (wɟt). It was the eye of one of the earliest Egyptian deities, Wadjet, who later became associated with Bastet, Mut, and Hathor as well. Wadjet was a solar deity and this symbol began as her all-seeing eye. In early artwork, Hathor is also depicted with this eye. Funerary amulets were often made in the shape of the Eye of Horus. The Wedjat or Eye of Horus is "the central element" of seven "gold, faience, carnelian and lapis lazuli" bracelets found on the mummy of Shoshenq II. The Wedjat "was intended to protect the king [here] in the afterlife" and to ward off evil. Egyptian and Near Eastern sailors would frequently paint the symbol on the bow of their vessel to ensure safe sea travel.

Conflict between Horus and Set 

Horus was told by his mother, Isis, to protect the people of Egypt from Set, the god of the desert, who had killed Horus' father, Osiris. Horus had many battles with Set, not only to avenge his father but to choose the rightful ruler of Egypt. In these battles, Horus came to be associated with Lower Egypt and became its patron.

According to The Contendings of Horus and Seth, Set is depicted as trying to prove his dominance by seducing Horus and then having sexual intercourse with him. However, Horus places his hand between his thighs and catches Set's semen, then subsequently throws it in the river so that he may not be said to have been inseminated by Set. Horus (or Isis herself in some versions) then deliberately spreads his semen on some lettuce, which was Set's favourite food. After Set had eaten the lettuce, they went to the gods to try to settle the argument over the rule of Egypt. The gods first listened to Set's claim of dominance over Horus, and call his semen forth, but it answered from the river, invalidating his claim. Then, the gods listened to Horus' claim of having dominated Set, and call his semen forth, and it answered from inside Set.

However, Set still refused to relent, and the other gods were getting tired from over eighty years of fighting and challenges. Horus and Set challenged each other to a boat race, where they each raced in a boat made of stone. Horus and Set agreed, and the race started. But Horus had an edge: his boat was made of wood painted to resemble stone, rather than true stone. Set's boat, being made of heavy stone, sank, but Horus' did not. Horus then won the race, and Set stepped down and officially gave Horus the throne of Egypt. Upon becoming king after Set's defeat, Horus gives offerings to his deceased father Osiris, thus reviving and sustaining him in the afterlife. After the New Kingdom, Set was still considered the lord of the desert and its oases.

In many versions of the story, Horus and Set divide the realm between them. This division can be equated with any of several fundamental dualities that the Egyptians saw in their world. Horus may receive the fertile lands around the Nile, the core of Egyptian civilization, in which case Set takes the barren desert or the foreign lands that are associated with it; Horus may rule the earth while Set dwells in the sky; and each god may take one of the two traditional halves of the country, Upper and Lower Egypt, in which case either god may be connected with either region. Yet in the Memphite Theology, Geb, as judge, first apportions the realm between the claimants and then reverses himself, awarding sole control to Horus. In this peaceable union, Horus and Set are reconciled, and the dualities that they represent have been resolved into a united whole. Through this resolution, the order is restored after the tumultuous conflict.

Egyptologists have often tried to connect the conflict between the two gods with political events early in Egypt's history or prehistory. The cases in which the combatants divide the kingdom, and the frequent association of the paired Horus and Set with the union of Upper and Lower Egypt, suggest that the two deities represent some kind of division within the country. Egyptian tradition and archaeological evidence indicate that Egypt was united at the beginning of its history when an Upper Egyptian kingdom, in the south, conquered Lower Egypt in the north. The Upper Egyptian rulers called themselves "followers of Horus", and Horus became the tutelary deity of the unified polity and its kings. Yet Horus and Set cannot be easily equated with the two halves of the country. Both deities had several cult centers in each region, and Horus is often associated with Lower Egypt and Set with Upper Egypt. Other events may have also affected the myth. Before even Upper Egypt had a single ruler, two of its major cities were Nekhen, in the far south, and Nagada, many miles to the north. The rulers of Nekhen, where Horus was the patron deity, are generally believed to have unified Upper Egypt, including Nagada, under their sway. Set was associated with Nagada, so it is possible that the divine conflict dimly reflects an enmity between the cities in the distant past. Much later, at the end of the Second Dynasty (c. 2890–2686 BCE), Pharaoh Seth-Peribsen used the Set animal to write his serekh name in place of the falcon hieroglyph representing Horus. His successor Khasekhemwy used both Horus and Set in the writing of his serekh. This evidence has prompted conjecture that the Second Dynasty saw a clash between the followers of the Horus king and the worshippers of Set led by Seth-Peribsen. Khasekhemwy's use of the two animal symbols would then represent the reconciliation of the two factions, as does the resolution of the myth.

Golden Horus Osiris 
Horus gradually took on the nature as both the son of Osiris and Osiris himself. He was referred to as Golden Horus Osiris. In the temple of Denderah he is given the full royal titulary of both that of Horus and Osiris. He was sometimes believed to be both the father of himself as well as his own son, and some later accounts have Osiris being brought back to life by Isis.

Other forms of Horus

Heru-ur (Horus the Elder) 
Heru-ur (or Herwer), (Haroeris to the Ptolemaic Greeks), also known as Horus the Elder, was a form of Horus, where he was the son of Geb and Nut. He was one of the oldest gods of ancient Egypt. He absorbed a number of local gods including a hawk god Nekheny the nome of Nekhen and Wer (a god of light known as “the great one” whose eyes were the sun and moon) to become the patron of Nekhen (Hierakonpolis), the first national god ("God of the Kingdom") and later the patron god of the pharaohs. Nekhen was a powerful city in the pre-dynastic period, and the early capital of Upper Egypt. By the Old Kingdom he was simply referred to as Horus and had become the first national god and the patron of the Pharaoh.

He was called the son of truth – signifying his role as an important upholder of Maat. His right eye was the Sun and the left one was the Moon. Heru-ur was sometimes depicted fully as a falcon, he was sometimes given the title Kemwer, meaning "(the) great black (one)".

Other variants include Hor Merti 'Horus of the two eyes' and Horkhenti Irti.

Heru-pa-khered (Horus the Younger) 
Heru-pa-khered (Harpocrates to the Ptolemaic Greeks), also known as Horus the Younger,  is represented in the form of a youth wearing a lock of hair (a sign of youth) on the right of his head while sucking his finger. In addition, he usually wears the united crowns of Egypt, the crown of Upper Egypt and the crown of Lower Egypt. He is a form of the rising sun, representing its earliest light.

Heru-Behdeti (Horus of Behdet) 
The winged sun of Horus of Edfu and depicted on the top of pylons in the ancient temples throughout Egypt.

Her-em-akhet (Horus in the Horizon) 
Her-em-akhet (or Horemakhet), (Harmakhis in Greek), represented the dawn and the early morning sun. He was often depicted as a sphinx with the head of a man (like the Great Sphinx of Giza), or as a hieracosphinx, a creature with a lion's body and a falcon's head and wings, sometimes with the head of a lion or ram (the latter providing a link to the god Khepri, the rising sun). It was believed that he was the inspiration for the Great Sphinx of Giza, constructed under the order of Khafre, whose head it depicts.

Other forms of Horus include:

Hor Merti ('Horus of the Two Eyes');
Horkhenti Irti;
Her-sema-tawy ('Horus Uniter of the Two Lands'), the Greek Harsomptus, depicted like the double-crowned Horus
Her-iunmutef or Iunmutef, depicted as a priest with a leopard-skin over the torso;
Herui (the "double falcon or Horuses"), the 5th nome god of Upper Egypt in Coptos

Celebrations of Horus 
The Festival of Victory (Egyptian: Heb Nekhtet) was an annual Egyptian festival dedicated to the god Horus. The Festival of Victory was celebrated at the Temple of Horus at Edfu, and took place during the second month of the Season of the Emergence (or the sixth month of the Egyptian calendar).

The ceremonies which took place during the Festival of Victory included the performance of a sacred drama which commemorated the victory of Horus over Set. The main actor in this drama was the king of Egypt himself, who played the role of Horus. His adversary was a hippopotamus, who played the role of Set. In the course of the ritual, the king would strike the hippopotamus with a harpoon. The destruction of the hippopotamus by the king commemorated the defeat of Set by Horus, which also legitimised the king.

It is unlikely that the king attended the Festival of Victory every year; in many cases he was probably represented by a priest. It is also unlikely that a real hippopotamus was used in the festival every year; in many cases it was probably represented by a model.

The 4th-century Roman author Macrobius mentions another annual Egyptian festival dedicated to Horus in his Chronicon. Macrobius specifies this festival as occurring on the winter solstice. The 4th-century Christian bishop Epiphanius of Salamis also mentions a winter solstice festival of Horus in his Panarion. However, this festival is not attested in any native Egyptian sources.

Suggested influence on Christianity 
William R. Cooper's 1877 book and Acharya S's self-published 2008 book, among others, have suggested that there are many similarities between the story of Horus and the much later story of Jesus. This outlook remains very controversial and is disputed.

In popular culture 
Declan Hannigan portrays Horus in the Marvel Cinematic Universe (MCU) television series Moon Knight (2022).

Horus is a Warrior class God in the Multiplayer online battle arena game Smite with the title of "The Rightful Heir".

In the fantasy action film Gods of Egypt Horus is portrayed Nikolaj Coster-Waldau, who also portrays Jaime Lannister in Game of Thrones. In the film, he helps out a mortal named Bek to stop his uncle Set while also trying to reclaim his throne and bring peace to Egypt.

Gallery

See also 
 Hawk of Quraish

Notes

References

External links

 Britannica Online: Horus (Egyptian God)

 
Egyptian gods
LGBT themes in mythology
Falcon deities
Savior gods
Sky and weather gods
Solar gods
Lunar gods
Tutelary deities
Mythological kings
Lion deities
Avian humanoids